Forgy may refer to:

 Forgy, Ohio, unincorporated community in Ohio, USA
 William Forgy McNagny, American politician
 Alice Forgy Kerr, American politician
 Larry Forgy, American politician
 Charles Forgy, American computer scientist

See also 
 Forge (disambiguation)
 Forty